Campargue is a French surname. Notable people with the surname include:

 Benoît Campargue (born 1965), French judoka
 Paul Campargue (1903–1969), French journalist and politician

See also
 Camargue (disambiguation)

French-language surnames